John Stretch Park is a small roadside park on the south side of Lake Okeechobee. The park provides picnic areas, restrooms, a large grassy field, an outdoor basketball court, and a boat ramp. Admission is not charged. The entire north edge of the park is dominated by the twenty-foot dike surrounding the lake. Set into this dike at one end of the park are flood control machinery and a lock for moving boats into and out of the lake. The Lake Okeechobee Scenic Trail can be accessed from the park.

This park also displays several diesel engines, valves, and pipes that once were part of the flood control facility.

The park is named in honor of John H. Stretch. A plaque in the park explains that Stretch worked as director of recreation and conservation for the flood control district between 1963 and 1970.

Parks in Palm Beach County, Florida
Roadside parks